Shin Ok-cheol (Hangul: 신옥철; born March 21, 1983), known by his stage name Outsider (Hangul: 아웃사이더), is a South Korean rapper. He is known for his speed-rapping and is able to rap at 13 syllables per second. After a conflict between Outsider and MC Sniper's label, Sniper Sound, in July 2013, Outsider left the label and signed with ASSA.

Career

2004-2008: Discovery and Soliloquist

In 2004, Outsider began his career as an underground rapper and achieved some success with his debut EP "Come Outside". He released his first single "Speed Star" in 2006 and promoted the title track, "Motivation", on the SBS variety show The Truth Game. His fast rapping skills impressed Korean hip-hop legend, MC Sniper, who signed Outsider to his label, "Sniper Sound". On October 25, 2007, Outsider released his first full-length studio album, Soliloquist.

2008-2009: Maestro and mainstream success

After a year hiatus, Outsider's second album, released June 1, 2009, Maestro, had more mainstream success. The title track "Loner" held the #1 spot on both the Mnet and Melon music charts for more than five weeks, making Outsider one of the fastest rappers to reach #1 on Korean music charts. Outsider has performed on MBC, SBS, KBS, Mnet, and had appeared on SBS's Star King as a special guest. After the promotion for "Loner" ended, he started to promote another track from the same album titled "My Youth Confession"; the track was successful. Outsider has worked with underground and overground rappers such as MC Sniper, L.E.O, Illnit, DJ R2, Bae Chi Gi, Dok2, and more. He also did a special performance alongside singer K.Will.

2010-2012: The Outsider, Hero and military service

After a short hiatus, he returned on March 2, 2010, to release an EP titled "Vol. 2.5 The Outsider" along with a music video for the album's single, "Acquaintance (주변인)", in which Outsider revisits the sound of "Loner", which mixes hip-hop with a classical edge. During this period, he garnered publicity for his remake of Big Bang's "Lies". He was also featured on a charity single entitled "Faddy Robot Foundation" with Vasco, Verbal Jint(버벌 진트), Sangchu, Yong Junhyung, Joosuc, Hyuna, and Zico.

On October 21, 2010, he released his 3rd album titled "Hero" along with two singles; "주인공 (Hero)" featuring fellow label-mate, LMNOP, and "Attitude Needed When Breaking Up (이별할 때 필요한 자세)" featuring fellow hip-hop artist, Kuan of All That. The album garnered success, despite being released without a music video or many live performances to promote the album. The song "Hero" rose to #7 on the Mnet Single Charts, #5 on Melon, and #4 on the prestigious Gaon Chart. On December 21, 2010, Outsider enlisted for mandatory military service for five weeks of basic training followed by 21 months of active duty in Wonju, Gangwon Province. He was discharged on September 24, 2012.

2013-present: Rebirth Outsider and Sniper Sound conflict

In June 2013, after a three year hiatus, Outsider announced plans to release his 4th studio album in July. On June 25, 2013, Outsider pre-released the single "Crying Bird" featuring Lee Soo Young.

On July 4, 2013, Outsider filed a lawsuit against Sniper Sound over financial issues. In a press release, Outsider claimed he never received proper pay or credit for his various activities and copyrights. Sniper Sound in turn filed an opposing lawsuit against Outsider calling him to halt his recent activities. The conflict broke when fans were unable to buy Outsider's previous songs from 2007-2010 released under MC Sniper's Sniper Sound because they were no longer available.

On July 22, 2013, despite the conflict with his former label, Outsider made his first official comeback after being discharged from the military with the mini album "Rebirth Outsider" under his own label "ASSA Communication".  The album's title track Bye U features G.O. of MBLAQ as Outsider's first idol collaboration. The album also features San E, Tymee (formerly E.via) and more.

Personal life
Outsider was married on March 31, 2012, at Seoul's Gangnam Imperial Palace Hotel. His wife, Lee Yongbin (이영빈) is director of a  dance troupe as well as the CEO of a cultural contents enterprise.

He has a daughter who was born on March 9, 2016. They appeared on KBS reality show 'The Return of Superman' in 2017 (Ep191-192) as special guests.

Discography

Studio albums

Reissued albums

Extended plays

Singles

Filmography

Variety show

Awards and nominations

Mnet Asian Music Awards

References

1983 births
South Korean male rappers
South Korean hip hop record producers
Rappers from Seoul
Living people